Sonoraville is an unincorporated community in Gordon County, Georgia, United States, located seven miles outside Calhoun.

History
A post office called Sonoraville was established in 1854, and remained in operation until being discontinued in 1909. The community was probably named after Sonora, in commemoration of the Mexican–American War.

Education
Sonoraville High School is the community's high school; it was created in 2005 for grades 9 and 10. Within the next two years, Sonoraville became a normal high school with all grades 9–12. The principal is Amy Stewart. The mascot is the Phoenix, and the colors are red, black and white.

Notable People 
George Right Smith - (1837 - 1903), Private in the Confederate Army elevated to the rank of 1st Lieutenant. Born in Cartersville, he bought a farm after the war and settled with his new wife in Sonoraville. Buried at the now Sonoraville Baptist Church cemetery.

References

External links
 Sonoraville Baptist Church
 Sonoraville High School
 Old Sonora P.O. Now Sonoraville historical marker

Unincorporated communities in Gordon County, Georgia
Unincorporated communities in Georgia (U.S. state)